The men's basketball tournament at the 2019 Pan American Games was held in Lima, Peru at the Coliseo Eduardo Dibos from 31 July to 4 August. The teams were grouped into two pools of four teams each for a round-robin preliminary round. The top two teams in each group advanced to a single elimination bracket. Argentina won the gold medal, its second gold in Pan American basketball, after defeating Puerto Rico in the championship

Qualification
A total of eight men's teams qualified to compete at the games. The top seven teams at the 2017 FIBA AmeriCup have qualified. The host nation Peru was barred from participating by FIBA, following sanctions imposed on the Peruvian Basketball Federation. Venezuela took the vacated berth.

Summary

Draw
The draw was held in San Juan, Puerto Rico on 23 May 2019.

Rosters

At the start of tournament, all eight participating countries had up to 12 players on their rosters.

Competition format
In the first round of the competition, teams are divided into two pools of four teams, and play follows a round robin format with each of the teams playing all other teams in the pool once. Teams are awarded two points for a win, and one point for a loss.

Following the completion of the pool games, the top two teams from each pool advance to a single elimination round consisting of two semifinal games, and the bronze and gold medal matches. Losing teams compete in classification matches to determine their ranking in the tournament.

Results
All times are local (UTC−5)

Preliminary round

Group A

Group B

Classification round

Placement stage (5th–8th place)

Seventh place match

Fifth place match

Knockout round

Semifinals

Bronze medal match

Gold medal match

Final standings

References

Men's tournament